Sheena Elizabeth McDonald (born 25 July 1954, Dunfermline, Fife, Scotland) is a Scottish journalist and broadcaster.

Early life
She was the daughter of Very Rev William J. G. McDonald, minister of Mayfield church in Edinburgh, and Moderator of the General Assembly of the Church of Scotland in 1989. He himself was a broadcaster, contributing to Thought for the Day for many years.

She was a pupil at George Watson's Ladies College, and then read English at the University of Edinburgh from where she graduated in 1976 before gaining a postgraduate certificate in radio, film and television studies from the University of Bristol. Whilst at university in Edinburgh, she had a relationship with then-Rector Gordon Brown. She also co-founded the Edinburgh Festival Fringe newspaper Festival Times with Garfield Kennedy.

Broadcasting 
In 1978 she began her professional broadcasting career as a producer and presenter at BBC Radio Scotland. She switched to television in 1981 as a presenter, continuity announcer and newsreader at STV, then went freelance in 1986, moving on to anchor such national radio and television news programmes as The World at One, Channel 4 News, 'The World This Week', After Dark and International Question Time and, in 1995, she received the first-ever 'Woman in Film and Television' Award.

Accident 
In February 1999 she was struck by a police van on its way to a 999 call in Clerkenwell, London. She sustained head injuries, and it was almost five years before she returned to television, in a biographical documentary in which she spoke of her recuperation process and coming to terms with the psychological effects of her injury.

In 2019 she wrote a book Rebuilding Life after Brain Injury: Dreamtalk for a series presenting brain injury survivor stories, describing in detail her injury and the progression of her recovery, with contributions and commentary from her husband Allan Little and her rehabilitation specialist Gail Robinson.

Personal life 
She married BBC reporter Allan Little in 2006.  The two have been together since 1993.

Presenting roles 

McDonald's presenting roles have included:

Television

 The Afternoon Show, BBC Scotland (1981)
 What's Your Problem? STV, (1981 - 1984) 
 Scotland Today, STV (1984–1987)
 Votes for Woman (1988) 14 episodes
 The World This Week (1989–93)
 Scottish Women (1989–1992)
 After Dark (1989-2003) 3 episodes
 Fighting Talk, (1991)
 Right to Reply (1982-2001), 1991-93
 On the Record, BBC, circa 1993
 Channel 4 News
 Gimme Health, (1994)
 House to House (1995–98)  
 Powerhouse (1998)
 Brain Injury - The Road to Rehabilitation, Disabilities Trust (2002)
 Who Am I Now?, Storyville, BBC Four (2004)
 Talking Point, Teachers' TV. (2005-6)
 Need to Know, Teachers' TV. (2007-8)
 General Assembly of the Church of Scotland (highlights), BBC Scotland (2007-2022)

Radio

 Mayfield community hospital radio (1970s, as a teenager) 
 Joy to the World, Radio 4, (with Allan Little; Christmas morning broadcast, 1999)
 Something Understood, Radio 4, (2001-2)
 Talking Politics, Radio 4, (2000-08)
 The World Today, BBC World Service
 also isolated editions of The Week in Westminster, The World At One, The World This Weekend, The World Tonight (1994, 1996, 2000-03) and Pick of the Week (2002-07)
 Child of the Manse, Radio Scotland (2008) (subject)

References

External links
 Sheena McDonald in the BFI database
 Sheena McDonald in the BBC programme index
 Allan Little, Sheena McDonald & Gail Robinson at the Edinburgh International Book Festival, Edinburgh Book Festival via youtube, August 2019. 

1954 births
Alumni of the University of Bristol
Alumni of the University of Edinburgh
People educated at George Watson's College
Living people
People from Dunfermline
Scottish journalists
Scottish women journalists
Scottish television presenters
British women television presenters
STV News newsreaders and journalists